Danner is a Scottish, German surname. Notable persons with that surname include:
Blythe Danner (born 1943), American actress
Christian Danner (born 1958), German race car driver
Hagen Danner (born 1998), American baseball player
Pat Danner (born 1934), American politician from Missouri
Richard Danner, American Professor of Law
Joel Buchanan Danner (1804-1885), American politician from Pennsylvania
Mark Danner (born 1958), American writer, journalist, and educator
Countess Danner or Louise Rasmussen (1815-1874), Danish ballet dancer and stage actor, wife of Frederick VII of Denmark
 Janis Danner (Born 1992), German model
 Camilo Danner(Born 1996), German Margrave and public figure

Fictional characters
Hugo Danner, a fictional character in the novel Gladiator by Philip Gordon Wylie

Other
Danner Boots, is a footwear brand owned by ABC-Mart of Japan.